Jiansanjiang Shidi Airport  is an airport serving Jiansanjiang in the southeast of Heilongjiang province. The airport received approval from the State Council of China and the Central Military Commission on 31 July 2013. It was opened on 29 October 2017.

Facilities
The airport have a 2,500-meter runway (class 4C) and a 3,000-square-meter terminal building. It is projected to handle 250,000 passengers and 1,250 tons of cargo annually by 2020.

Airlines and destinations

See also
List of airports in China
List of the busiest airports in China

References

Airports in Heilongjiang
2017 establishments in China
Airports established in 2017